Robby J. Albarado (born September 11, 1973, in Lafayette, Louisiana) is an American Thoroughbred horse racing jockey. He began riding at the age of 10 and progressed to riding at bush tracks in his native Louisiana by the age of 12. After turning professional, he earned his first official win at Evangeline Downs in 1990. Since then, he has won more than 5,000 races, but his career has endured setbacks as a result of serious injuries. During 1998 and 1999, he suffered two skull fractures, one of which required doctors to replace a damaged portion of his skull with titanium mesh and polymer plate. Another serious accident in the fall of 2000 kept him out of racing for the better part of 2001.

Background
Albarado's father was a jockey at the bush tracks in Louisiana and Albarado grew up wanting to race horses. "It's my earliest memory, maybe when I was four, five, six years old," he said in 2007. "I started with basics: cleaning stalls, walking horses and doing whatever it took to be close to it. Eventually I graduated to galloping horses when I was 9, 10 years old. From that point on it's all I wanted to do."

Albarado first began to ride at the age of 10, schooled by Shelton LeBlanc, a trainer in South Louisiana. Albarado began to ride at the Louisiana bush tracks at the age of 12 and turned professional at age 16.

Albarado is currently married to Paige Albarado, who works for Myracehorse.com as Midwest racing manager. They have a son Liam. He was previously married to Kimber Albarado, with whom he had three children, sons Kaden and Kash, and daughter Larkin. He has twice been accused of minor domestic violence offenses, though the charges involving Kimber were subsequently dismissed.

Racing career
Albarado scored his first career win on June 29, 1990 aboard One Little Point at Evangeline Downs. His first stakes win came in 1993 with Tuck's Honey Bear at Louisiana Downs in the Grady Madden Memorial. In 1995, he earned his first graded stakes win aboard Snake Eyes in the Stars and Stripes at Arlington Park. His first Grade I victory came in the 1998 Turf Classic at Churchill Downs on Joyeux Danseur.

Albarado's career experienced a major setback when he suffered skull fractures in both 1998 and 1999, requiring surgery where a portion of his skull was replaced with a titanium mesh and polymer plate. He was sidelined for most of 2001 after a fall in late 2000.

In 2003, he received his big break when he got the mount aboard Mineshaft, who scored four grade I wins including the Jockey Club Gold Cup on his way to winning the Eclipse Award for Horse of the Year. In 2005, the pair were inducted into the Fair Grounds Racing Hall of Fame. At the time of his induction, Albarado had won a record seven riding titles at the race course.

Albarado was voted the winner of the 2004 George Woolf Memorial Jockey Award. That year, on December 8, he picked up his 3,000th career win aboard Isle of Silver in the Fair Grounds Race Course in New Orleans.

He was the regular jockey for Curlin, who was the favorite and finished third in the 2007 Kentucky Derby. Albarado won his first Triple Crown race at the 2007 Preakness Stakes aboard Curlin, edging out Derby winner Street Sense.  The pair was denied victory at the 2007 Belmont Stakes when Curlin lost to champion filly Rags to Riches by a nose. Albarado later won the 2007 Breeders' Cup Classic aboard Curlin, which was his first Breeders' Cup win. The two combined to win the Dubai World Cup in 2008.

On May 30, 2009, he recorded the 4,000th win of his career, guiding Keertana to victory on the Matt Winn Turf Course in the 9th race at Churchill Downs.

In 2011, Albarado was scheduled to ride Animal Kingdom in the Kentucky Derby but was replaced because of injuries he suffered in a fall three days before the race. Animal Kingdom went on to win the Derby with replacement rider John Velazquez. In 2013, Albarado finished second in the Derby aboard Golden Soul.

, Albarado is the third-leading rider of all time at Churchill Downs, ranking behind only Hall of Famers Pat Day and Calvin Borel. He earned his 1,000th win at Churchill Downs on November 13, 2014. In 2008, he won the spring meet riding title with 73 wins. He has finished second in the standings seven times and in the top five 23 times.

On January 22, 2017, Albarado achieved the 5,000th win of his career, guiding Vivacious V. V. to victory in the 1st race at Fair Grounds Race Course. "It helps with the right horses, of course but I feel like I'm more comfortable out there and I'm making good decisions," he said in the days leading up to the milestone. "My agent Lenny (Pike) and I have been together for over 20 years and we have a great relationship and we feel great about how things are going. We are going after the right opportunities and the right spots."

On October 3, 2020, Albarado rode winner Swiss Skydiver in the 2020 Preakness Stakes.

Year-end charts

References 

 Robby Albarado at the NTRA
 Robby Albarado featured in Stride Magazine

1973 births
American jockeys
Cajun jockeys
Living people
Sportspeople from Lafayette, Louisiana